Francis Corbet, D.D.  was an Irish Anglican Dean.

Educated at Trinity College, Dublin, he was Treasurer of St Patrick’s Cathedral, Dublin from 1734 to 1750; and Dean from 1746 until his death on 25 August 1775.

Notes

Alumni of Trinity College Dublin
Irish Anglicans
Deans of St. Patrick's Cathedral, Dublin
1775 deaths